Nes aan de Amstel is a village in the municipality of Amstelveen in the province of North Holland, Netherlands. The village's name indicates that it is located on the Amstel; it is situated on the edge of the Rond Hoep polder.

History

The village was established in the 16th century and has gradually been developing since 1947. The landscape is largely determined by the town's Catholic church, the Sint-Urbanuskerk, built to a design by the architect Joseph Cuypers.

Events
Nes aan de Amstel is known for hosting the Dorpsfeest. Each year in the summer during the town festival, the slob en sloot race is organised, during which approximately 50 participants submit an itinerary through the fields and ditches around the town.

Notable people
Notable people from Nes aan de Amstel include:
Agatha Deken (1741–1804), writer and poet

References

External links 
 
 Official site (in Dutch)

Populated places in North Holland
Amstelveen